A Hatful of Rain is a 1957 American drama film about a young married man with a secret morphine addiction, based on a 1955 Broadway play of the same name. It is a medically and sociologically accurate account of the effects of morphine on an addict and his family. The frank depiction of drug addiction in a feature film was a rarity for its time.

The film stars Eva Marie Saint, Don Murray, Anthony Franciosa, Lloyd Nolan, and Henry Silva. It was adapted by Michael V. Gazzo, Alfred Hayes, and Carl Foreman from the play by Gazzo. Foreman was blacklisted at the time of the film's release. The Writers Guild of America added his name to the film's credits in 1998, 14 years after his death.  It was directed by Fred Zinnemann and features a strong musical score by Bernard Herrmann. Herrmann was asked by 20th Century Fox to rescore his prelude for the film as the original was considered "too terrifying".

Franciosa was nominated for an Oscar for Best Actor in a Leading Role.

Plot
In a housing project apartment in New York City near the Brooklyn Bridge, Johnny Pope (Don Murray) lives with his pregnant wife Celia (Eva Marie Saint) and his brother Polo (Anthony Franciosa). Johnny is a veteran recently returned from the Korean War, in which he sustained an injury while surviving for days trapped in a cave. His survival made him a hero in the newspapers, but his ensuing recuperation in a military hospital left him secretly addicted to the painkiller morphine, with Polo his only family member aware of his condition.

Johnny and Polo's father, John Sr. (Lloyd Nolan) arrives in New York from his home in Florida to briefly visit his sons, and to pick up $2500 that Polo had saved and promised to him whenever he wanted it. John Sr. has just fulfilled his dream of quitting his job and buying his own bar, and needs the money to pay for repairs and remodeling to the new business. However, Polo tells his father that he spent the money and refuses to say what he spent it on. John Sr. becomes angry and refuses to speak to Polo, continuing his lifetime pattern of praising Johnny and putting down Polo.

Later on, John Sr. expresses his pride in Johnny's war service and that he has married a fine wife, is starting a family, and lives in a nice apartment (for which he has even built much of the furniture by hand), while Polo by contrast is renting a room from his brother, is not married and works in a bar that his father considers low-class. Unbeknownst to their father and Celia, Polo gave the money to Johnny, who spent it all on his $40-a-day drug habit. John Sr. is also unaware that Johnny has lost four jobs in a row due to his habit and that Johnny and Celia are on the verge of divorce because Johnny ignores her and is gone for hours, including overnight. Celia thinks he is seeing another woman but in reality he is looking for drugs, which are becoming harder to find as the police are arresting many dealers.

Johnny begs for enough dope to last him until his father goes back to Florida the next day, and Mother gives him one dose, but warns him that he needs to pay at least $300 by the next day or they will put him in the hospital. Mother gives Johnny a gun and suggests he commit robbery to get the money. After arguing with Celia, Johnny leaves and spends the night walking the streets. He tries to rob several people at gunpoint, but is unable to go through with it. Meanwhile, Polo and Celia are home alone in the apartment (John Sr. having returned to his hotel) and Polo, who has been drinking, confesses his love for Celia, who in her loneliness and desperation is almost ready to return his love. Despite their mutual feelings for each other, they fall asleep in separate rooms.

When Johnny returns in the morning, he is starting to suffer withdrawal again and needs to meet a dealer for a fix, but his father expects to spend the day with him. Johnny tries to get his father to spend the day with Polo instead. but his father doesn't even want to talk to Polo, causing an emotional confrontation. John Sr. finally agrees to attend the football game with Polo. Johnny next coerces Polo into driving him to meet the dealer by threatening to throw himself out of the car in traffic, but when he arrives at the meeting place, the dealer is being arrested. Johnny goes into severe withdrawal and begins to hallucinate, just as Mother and his gang arrive to collect Johnny's debt payment. Upon learning that Johnny doesn't have the money, they give him one dose in exchange for the twelve dollars Polo has in his wallet, and tell Polo to sell his car to cover Johnny's $500 debt. Polo tells Johnny to tell Celia the truth, that he is a junkie.

The fix temporarily cures Johnny's withdrawal symptoms and he tries to make up with Celia by preparing a romantic dinner, only to have her tell him when she gets home from work that she no longer loves him and wants a divorce. But when he confesses that he is a junkie, and that his habit has caused his absence and inattention to her, she reacts supportively. His father and Polo then arrive for dinner and Johnny informs his father that he is a junkie and that Polo's $2500 was spent on drugs for him. His father gets angry, causing Johnny, who is going into withdrawal again, to run out of the apartment. Celia then becomes ill and has to be rushed to the hospital to make sure she will not lose the baby. When Johnny returns, he is menaced by Mother, but is saved by Polo who pays Mother the $500 he obtained by selling his car. Johnny announces his intention to get clean, even throwing a package of dope back to Mother. John Sr. and Celia (who has not lost the baby) return, and Celia takes charge, reassures Johnny, and calls the police to come get the sick Johnny and put him in the hospital.

Cast

 Don Murray as Johnny Pope
 Eva Marie Saint as Celia Pope
 Anthony Franciosa as Polo Pope
 Lloyd Nolan as John Pope, Sr.
 Henry Silva as Mother
 Gerald S. O'Loughlin as 
 William Hickey as Apples; this was Hickey's film debut
 Paul Kruger as Bartender
 Ralph Montgomery as Spectator
 Michael Vale as Cab Driver
 Art Fleming as Mounted Cop

Critical reception
Bosley Crowther of The New York Times hailed this production's 'emotional nakedness' in its depiction of addiction and its terrible costs. A Hatful of Rain is 'a tremendously taut and true description of human agony and shame, of solicitude and frustration and the piteousness of tangled love.'

See also
 List of American films of 1957

References

External links
 
 
 
 

1957 films
1957 drama films
20th Century Fox films
CinemaScope films
American black-and-white films
American drama films
American films based on plays
Films about addiction
Films about drugs
Films about heroin addiction
Films about veterans
Films directed by Fred Zinnemann
Films scored by Bernard Herrmann
Films set in New York City
Films shot in New York City
Films with screenplays by Carl Foreman
1950s English-language films
1950s American films